Hold on Me may refer to:

 "Hold on Me" (Grinspoon song), 2005
 "Hold on Me" (Marlon Roudette song), 2012
 "Hold on Me" (Phixx song), 2003